158 works and sketches survive of the Japanese artist known only by the art name Tōshūsai Sharaku.  Almost all were made over a ten-month period in 1794–1795, divided into four periods:

 5th month of Kansei 6 (May–June 1794) – 28 ōban prints
 7th and 8th months of Kansei 6 (July–September 1794) – 8 ōban and 30 hosoban prints
 11th and intercalary 11th months of Kansei 6 (November 1794 – January 1795) – 47 hosoban, 13 aiban, and 4 ōban prints
 1st month of Kansei 7 (February–March 1795) – 10 hosoban and 5 aiban prints

The print sizes became progressively smaller and the focus shifts from busts to full-length portraits.  The depictions become less expressive and more conventional.  Two picture calendars dating to as early as 1789 and three decorated fans as late as 1803 have been attributed to Sharaku, but have yet to be accepted as authentic works of his.  A number of hanshita-e preparatory drawings have also been found.

Background

In Sharaku's time the Kawarazaki-za, the Kiri-za, and the Miyako-za were the three major kabuki theatre houses of Edo: the Edo San-za.

Just over 600 copies of Sharaku's prints are known; only about 100 remain in Japan.  As they are in collections scattered throughout the world general research on Sharaku's works has followed different threads in Japan and the West has proved time-consuming.  Japanese researchers have better knowledge of and access to documents and literature related to Sharaku's time and conditions.  On the other hand, Sharaku's works tend to be in Western collections, including prints for which only one copy is known—of which there are about three dozen.  Three of these are of unknown whereabouts, known only through published photographs.  The largest Western collection is the 70 pieces at the Museum of Fine Arts, Boston, 6 of which are unique; the Art Institute of Chicago (8 unique pieces), New York's Metropolitan Museum of Art, the British Museum, and the Guimet Museum in Paris also have substantial collections.  In 1920, Kōjirō Matsukata bought a large number of ukiyo-e prints in Paris and brought them back to Japan.  These 70 pieces reside at the Tokyo National Museum, 3 of which are unique.

The prints bear no titles, and descriptive titles vary in both Japanese and English.  Amongst the variations in Japanese are the numbering for the generations of actors; for example, a second-generation actor's name might have nidai or nidaime prepended in some sources and nisei in others, or the generation might be absent.  The list here does not give variant titles, and the titles given are not official.

Print sizes

Sharaku's prints appeared in the common print sizes ōban, hosoban, and aiban.  The approximate dimensions of these sizes are:

ōban – 
hosoban – 
aiban –

Periodization

Sharaku's prints are divided into four periods.  The prints of the first two periods are signed "Tōshūsai Sharaku", and the latter two only 

 5th month of Kansei 6 – 28 ōban prints
 The 5th month of Kansei 6 fell from 29 May to 26 June 1794.
 7th and 8th months of Kansei 6 – 8 ōban and 30 hosoban prints
 The 7th month of Kansei 6 fell from 27 July to 25 August 1794, and the eighth month from 26 August to 23 September 1794.
 11th and intercalary 11th months of Kansei 6 – 47 hosoban, 13 aiban, and 4 ōban prints
 The 11th month of Kansei 6 fell from 23 November to 22 December 1794, and the intercalary 11th month from 23 December 1794 to 20 January 1795.
 1st month of Kansei 7 – 10 hosoban and 5 aiban prints
 The 1st month of the 7th year of Kansei fell from 19 February to 20 March 1795.

The print sizes progressively became smaller and the focus shifts from busts to full-length portraits.  The depictions become less expressive and more conventional.  Two picture calendars dating to as early as 1789 and three decorated fans as late as 1803 have been attributed to Sharaku, but have yet to be accepted as authentic works of his.

First period

Sharaku's first period is made up of twenty-eight known prints, each in ōban size.  They appeared in the 5th month of Kansei 6, which fell from 29 May to 26 June 1794.  They depict actors in their rôles in the kabuki plays Hana-ayame Bunroku Soga, Katakiuchi Noriai-banashi, Koi Nyōbō Somewake Tazuna, and Yoshitsune Senbon-zakura.

Hana-ayame Bunroku Soga 

Playwright Matsui Yūsuke's Hana-ayame Bunroku Soga ("Blooming Iris, Soga of the Bunroku Era") is a kabuki adaptation of a true story of revenge, the early 18th-century  in which the Ishii brothers Hanzō and Genzō spent 28 years to exact revenge on their father Uemon's murderer.  The story enjoyed great popularity and had several theatrical adaptations.

The play débuted at the Miyako-za theatre in the 5th month of 6th year of Kansei.  Many details of it are no longer known.  Ishii Genzō tries to kill his enemy Fujikawa Mizuemon, who instead kills Genzō and his wife.  The plot then follows Genzō's retainer Tanabe Bunzō and Genzō's orphaned son, who set off to exact revenge.  Ōgishi Kurando plays a selfless, stately samurai who lends a hand, and Bunzō's retainer Sodesuke serves as comic relief.  Hakujin Onayo's rôle is unknown, but it is thought she helps out with the revenge.

Ōtani Tokuji I as the manservant Sodesuke

Sodesuke is a faithful foot-man of the Ishii family.  He is present in the first scene, arriving late to meet his master Ishii Hyōei at a shrine in Hamamatsu in Tōtōmi Province.  He witnesses a group including Fujikawa Mizuemon ambush and kill Hyōei before the shrine under cover of darkness.  Sodesuke brings Hyōei's body to Hyōei's eldest son Genzō, in the middle of Genzō's wedding, and explains what has happened.  Sharaku depicts a shockeded Sodesuke as he arrives at the scene of his master's murder.

18 copies are known of the ōban print of Ōtani Tokuji I (1756–1807) as the manservant Sodesuke; one each are in the collections of the Tokyo National Museum, the Japan Ukiyo-e Museum, the Ukiyo-e Ōta Memorial Museum of Art, the Baur Foundation, the Museum of Asian Art, the British Museum, the Museum of Fine Arts, Boston, the Brooklyn Museum, the Art Institute of Chicago, the Cleveland Museum of Art, the Edoardo Chiossone Museum of Oriental Art, the Honolulu Museum of Art, the Harvard Art Museums, the Metropolitan Museum of Art, the Nelson-Atkins Museum of Art, the Philadelphia Museum of Art, and the Worcester Art Museum, and another is in a private collection.

Sakata Hangorō III as Fujikawa Mizuemon

The powerful Mizuemon, resentful at having lost a sword fight to his patron Ishii Hyōei, murders Hyōei and steals from him a secret book on Japanese swordsmanship.  Hyōei's sons attempt revenge, but in the third act Mizuemon kills Hyōei's eldest son Genzō and his wife at the Abe River in neighbouring Suruga Province.  Sharaku depicts Mizuemon at the scene of his murder of Genzō.  The print pairs with the one of Bandō Mitsugorō II as Ishii Genzō.

13 copies are known of the ōban print of Sakata Hangorō III as Fujikawa Mizuemon; one each are in the collections of the Tokyo National Museum, the Ukiyo-e Ōta Memorial Museum of Art, the Yamatane Museum, the Achenbach Foundation for Graphic Arts at the Fine Arts Museums of San Francisco, the Rijksmuseum, the Galerie Berès, the British Museum, the Museum of Fine Arts, Boston, the Art Institute of Chicago, the Guimet Museum, the Metropolitan Museum of Art, the Allen Memorial Art Museum, and a private collection.

Bandō Mitsugorō II as Ishii Genzō

When Ishii Genzō learns of the murder of his father in the middle of his wedding, he commits himself to revenge.  He attacks the murderer Mizuemon's father in the second act, and in the third tries to kill Mizuemon at the Abe River in Suruga Province, but Mizuemon turns then table and kills Genzō and his wife.  Sharaku depicts Genzō at his encounter with Mizuemon at the Abe River.  The print pairs with the one of Sakata Hangorō III as Fujikawa Mizuemon.

9 copies of the ōban print of Bandō Mitsugorō II as Ishii Genzō; one each are in the collections of the Tokyo National Museum, the Nara Prefectural Museum of Art, the Galerie Berès, the British Museum, the Museum of Fine Arts, Boston, the Royal Museums of Art and History, the Art Institute of Chicago, the Guimet Museum, and the Metropolitan Museum of Art.

Sanogawa Ichimatsu III as Hakujin Onayo of Gion and Ichikawa Tomiemon as Kanisaka Tōma

Tōma is one of Mizuemon's followers, and Onayo a prostitute of the Gion district.  The print depicts the pair in the fourth act, when Tōma has fallen into such financial ruin that he takes on work as a gidayū reciter in bunraku puppet theatre.  At this point, he becomes involved with Hakujin Onayo, a prostitute of the Gion district.

6 copies are known of the ōban print of Sanogawa Ichimatsu III as Hakujin Onayo of Gion and Ichikawa Tomiemon as Kanisaka Tōma; one each are in the collections of the Tokyo National Museum, the Rijksmuseum, the Museum of Asian Art, the Royal Museums of Art and History, and the Art Institute of Chicago, and another is in a private collection.

Sanogawa Ichimatsu III as Hakujin Onayo of Gion

Hakujin Onayo is a prostitute of Gion, played by Ichimatsu, an onnagata—a male actor who performed female rôles.  Her rôle in the narrative is unknown, but it is thought she helps out with the revenge.  She may have played a rôle similar to that of Okaru in the Kanadehon Chūshingura; Okaru had herself sold into prostitution to raise funds a vendetta.  She wears on her clothes the hiragana character "い" ("i") enclosed in a circle—the same mon crest the karō Ōgishi Kurando wears.

10 copies are known of the ōban print of Sanogawa Ichimatsu III as Hakujin Onayo of Gion.  One copy each are in the collections of the Tokyo National Museum, the Hiraki Ukiyo-e Foundation, the Achenbach Foundation for Graphic Arts at the Fine Arts Museums of San Francisco, the British Museum, the Museum of Fine Arts, Boston, the Royal Museums of Art and History, the Art Institute of Chicago, the Edoardo Chiossone Museum of Oriental Art, and the Guimet Museum; and one in a private collection.

Sawamura Sōjūrō III as Ōgishi Kurando

Ōgishi Kurando is the karō (house elder) of the Momoi daimyō family of Kameyama Castle and sympathizes with the Ishii brothers.  He wears on his clothes a mon crest with the hiragana character "い" ("i") enclosed in a circle, for which Mizuemon mistakes him for a member of the Ishiis in the fifth act and attacks him at a teahouse in Gion.  Kurando discovers that his attacker is Mizuemon, and that he has the secret book of swordsmanship.  Kurando goes on to help the Ishii brothers get their revenge in the seventh act.  Sharaku depicts Kurando at the teahouse in the fifth act.

11 copies are known of the ōban print of Sawamura Sōjūrō III as Ōgishi Kurando; one each are in the collections of the Tokyo National Museum, the British Museum, the Museum of Fine Arts, Boston, the Art Institute of Chicago, the Honolulu Museum of Art, the Harvard Art Museums, and the Philadelphia Museum of Art; two are in the collection of the Guimet Museum; and two are in private collections.

Segawa Kikunojō III as Oshizu, wife of Tanabe Bunzō

Oshizu is the wife of the Ishii foot-soldier Tanabe Bunzō, who runs into financial ruin in faithful service to his masters.  The print depicts Oshizu in the sixth act, as they struggle to repay a usurer and resort to prostituting their daughter Omitsu.  She wraps her head in a yamai hachimaki ("sickness headband"), a purple headband of silk crepe often worn in kabuki to indicate sickness.  Above it a yellow comb decorates the hair.  The kimono is white with a faded violet pattern, under which are green and rose garments, all bound with a black obi sash.  The portrait is on a dark mica background, and mica is dusted on the collar.

Ichikawa Yaozō III as Tanabe Bunzō

Bunzō is an Ishii retainer who devoted himself to the brothers' revenge.  In the third act, at the Abe River in Suruga Province in the third act, Mizuemon's group fends off Genzō's group, kills Genzō and his wife, and cripples Bunzō with a wound to the leg.  The print depicts Bunzō in the sixth act as an impoverished rōnin at the Ishibe-juku in Ōmi Province.

11 copies are known of the ōban print of Ichikawa Yaozō III as Tanabe Bunzō; one each in the collection of the Tokyo National Museum, the Hiraki Ukiyo-e Foundation, the British Museum, the Museum of Fine Arts, Boston,  the Royal Museums of Art and History, the Art Institute of Chicago, the Grabhorn Collection at the Asian Art Museum of San Francisco, the Guimet Museum, the Honolulu Museum of Art, and the Harvard Art Museums; and one is in a private collection.

Arashi Ryūzō II as Ishibe Kinkichi the moneylender

The name "Ishibe Kinkichi" is used as a common noun in Japanese to refer to a person with an inflexible character; the play's character, a moneylender at Ishibe-juku in Ōmi Province, has a personality lacking in humanity and empathy.  In the sixth act, when the destitute Tanabe Bunzō and his wife Oshizu are unable to repay a debt to him, Kinkichi has them sell him their daughter Omitsu as a prostitute.  The actor Ryūzō was known as a master of villainous rôles, and Sharaku's print expresses his hard, unempathetic character in this scene.

22 copies are known of the ōban print of Arashi Ryūzō II as Ishibe Kinkichi the moneylender. It had earlier sold at Sotheby's in 1975 for US$ and in 1989 at Christie's for GBP£.

Segawa Tomisaburō II as Yadorigi, wife of Ōgishi Kurando, and Nakamura Man'yo as the chambermaid Wakakusa

The scene is from the seventh act, at the Ōgishi manor below Kameyama Castle.  The print contrasts Tomisaburō's slender face with the jowly Man'yo.

7 copies are known of the ōban print of Segawa Tomisaburō II as Yadorigi, wife of Ōgishi Kurando, and Nakamura Man'yo as the chambermaid Wakakusa.  One each is in the collections of the Tokyo National Museum, the Hiraki Ukiyo-e Foundation, the Rijksmuseum, the Museum of Fine Arts, Boston, the Art Institute of Chicago, the Dutch National Museum of Ethnology, and the Metropolitan Museum of Art.

Segawa Tomisaburō II as Yadorigi, wife of Ōgishi Kurando

Tomisaburō was a student of Segawa Kikunojō III, whose style as an onnagata he imitated.  He was considered a versatile actor who excelled at rôles as young girls and courtesans, but who lack in social graces, for which he was given nicknames such as Iya-Tomi or Niku-Tomi (both roughly "Horrid Tomi").

It is not known what scene this image represents, but it is assumed to be a different one from that of the other portrait of Yadorigi, as her clothes are different.  Some have suggested the scene may be from Act 5.

Katakiuchi Noriai-banashi

Katakiuchi Noriai-banashi ("A Medley of Tales of Revenge") by the playwright  débuted at the Kiri-za in the 5th month of the 6th year of Kansei.  The play combines two revenge tales: Katakiuchi Ganryūjima ("Ganryū-jima Revenge") and Gotaiheiki Shiroishi Banashi ("The Tale of Shiroishi and the Taihei Chronicles").  The play's villain Shiga Daishichi murders Matsushita Mikinoshin, whose death his daughters Miyagino and Shinobu spend years to avenge, with the help of Gorobē, a fishmonger of San'ya.

Onoe Matsusuke I as Matsushita Mikinoshin

Mikinoshin is a rōnin who has fallen sick and fallen into poverty; he is the father of two daughters, Miyagino and Shinobu.  Sharaku depicts him in a miserable state here in the third act, in which the villains Shiga Daishichi and an accomplice murder him.  Onoe Matsusuke was best known for his rôles as villains, but performed in this play as the lead protagonist.

ōban print of Onoe Matsusuke I as Matsushita Mikinoshin

Ichikawa Komazō III as Shiga Daishichi

ōban print of Ichikawa Komazō III as Shiga Daishichi

Morita Kan'ya VIII as the palanquin-bearer Uguisu no Jirōsaku

Jirōsaku is Miyagino's palanquin-bearer, and has transported Miyagino to the red-light district to visit his daughter, whom he has sold into prostitution.  Jirōsaku appears during the performance of the dance segment "Hana-ayame omoi no kanzashi" ("Iris Headdress of Remembrance") in the fourth act.  He takes the rôle of Japanese bush warbler in the dance, opposite Soga no Jūrō Sukenari disguised as Gorobē as lesser cuckoo; Jūrō is a faithful servant of the Sogas.

9 copies are known of the ōban print of Morita Kan'ya VIII as the palanquin-bearer Uguisu no Jirōsaku; one each is in the collections of the Tokyo National Museum, the Yamatane Museum, the Museum of Asian Art, the British Museum, the Museum of Fine Arts, Boston, the Royal Museums of Art and History, the Guimet Museum, the Metropolitan Museum of Art, and the Allen Memorial Art Museum.

Matsumoto Yonesaburō I as Kewaizaka no Shōshō, actually Shinobu

ōban print of Matsumoto Yonesaburō I as Kewaizaka no Shōshō, actually Shinobu

Nakayama Tomisaburō I as Miyagino

8 copies are known of the ōban print of Nakayama Tomisaburō I as Miyagino.  One each is in the collections of the Tokyo National Museum, the Nara Prefectural Museum of Art, the British Museum, the Museum of Fine Arts, Boston, the Edoardo Chiossone Museum of Oriental Art, the Harvard Art Museums, and the Metropolitan Museum of Art, and another is in a private collection.

Matsumoto Kōshirō IV as San'ya no Sakanaya Gorobē

ōban print of Matsumoto Kōshirō IV as San'ya no Sakanaya Gorobē

Nakajima Wadaemon I as Bōdara Chōzaemon and Nakamura Konozō I as Gon of the Kanagawaya

ōban print of Nakajima Wadaemon I as Bōdara Chōzaemon and Nakamura Konozō I as Gon of the Kanagawaya

There are few details about Bōdara Chōzaemon and Gon of the Kanagawaya, who appear together in this print, but they are said to have been minor characters in Katakiuchi Noriai-banashi.  Sharaku has nonetheless delineated their traits as carefully as he has those of the main characters.

Koi Nyōbō Somewake Tazuna

Koi Nyōbō Somewake Tazuna ("The Loving Wife's Particoloured Reins") débuted in 1751 in Osaka as a bunraku puppet play and arrived in Edo later the same year as a kabuki play at the Nakamura-za (later called the Miyako-za).

The scene focuses on the adulterous relationship of Date no Yosaku, who is a retainer of the Yurugi clan of Tanba Province, and the woman-in-waiting Shigenoi.  Trouble befalls the couple at the hands of those such as the wicked retainer Washizuka Happeiji, who has the manservant Edobei steal public funds from Yosaku.  Shigenoi gives birth to Yosaku's son, and he father, the Noh master Takemura Sadanoshin, takes responsibility by killing himself by seppuku.  The Yurugi daimyō takes in Shigenoi as a wet nurse for his daughter Shirabe-hime, but she is forced to part with Yosaku and their son.
Amongst the other characters Sharaku depicts are the Yurugi house's messenger Sagisaka Sanai, Yosaku's manservant Ippei; the character Osagawa Tsuneyo II plays is not certain, but may be Ippei's sister Osan.

Ichikawa Omezō I as the manservant Ippei

ōban print of Ichikawa Omezō I as the manservant (yakko) Ippei

Ōtani Oniji III as the manservant Edobei

ōban print of Ōtani Oniji III as the manservant Edobei

Later in the year, Ōtani Oniji III succeeded to the stage name of Nakamura Nakazō I and became Nakamura Nakazō II.  He performed in Uruō Toshi Meika no Homare and appears in Sharaku's print of Nakamura Nakazō II as Saizō Saiwaka.

Iwai Hanshirō IV as the wet nurse Shigenoi

ōban print of Iwai Hanshirō IV as the wet nurse Shigenoi

Ichikawa Monnosuke II as Date no Yosaku

ōban print of Ichikawa Monnosuke II as Date no Yosaku

Bandō Hikosaburō III as Sagisaka Sanai

ōban print of Bandō Hikosaburō III as Sagisaka Sanai

Tanimura Torazō I as Washizuka Happeiji

ōban print of Tanimura Torazō I as Washizuka Happeiji

Ichikawa Ebizō I as Takemura Sadanoshin

ōban print of Ichikawa Ebizō I as Takemura Sadanoshin

Osagawa Tsuneyo II as Ippei's sister Osan

ōban print of Osagawa Tsuneyo II as Ippei's sister Osan

Iwai Kiyotarō I as Fujinami, wife of Sagisaka Sanai, and Bandō Zenji I as Kozasa, wife of Washizuka Kandayū

ōban print of Iwai Kiyotarō I as Fujinami, wife of Sagisaka Sanai, and Bandō Zenji I as Kozasa, wife of Washizuka Kandayū

Yoshitsune Senbon-zakura

Sawamura Yodogorō II as Kawatsura Hōgen and Bandō Zenji I as Oni Sadobō

ōban print of Sawamura Yodogorō II as Kawatsura Hōgen and Bandō Zenji I as Oni Sadobō

Second period

Shinozuka Uraemon I as the announcer at Miyako-za

Before a performance and between scenes, a backstage representative or one of the actors came onstage to give a kōjō announcement to the audience about such things as scene changes, actors' name changes, and actor promotions.  Here, the actor Shinozuka Uraemon I wears the Miyako-za mon crest on his sleeve and reads an announcement that bleeds through the scroll he holds.  It reads:

 
 
 Kōjō: We will show you part two of the newly published actors' portraits.

Seven copies are known Shinozuka Uraemon I as the announcer at Miyako-za; one each are in the Tokyo National Museum, the British Museum, the Bibliothèque nationale de France, the Museum of Fine Arts, Boston, the Royal Museums of Art and History, the Art Institute of Chicago, and the Metropolitan Museum of Art.  Copies exist of a different state that lacks the writing on the scroll.

Keisei Sanbon Karakasa

Yamashina Shirōjūrō as Nagoya Sanzaemon

Three copies are known of the hosoban print of Yamashina Shirōjūrō as Nagoya Sanzaemon, one each in the collections of the Art Institute of Chicago, the Grabhorn Collection at the Asian Art Museum of San Francisco, and the Metropolitan Museum of Art.

Sanokawa Ichimatsu III as Sekinoto, wife of Fuwa Benzaemon

The hosoban print of Sanokawa Ichimatsu III as Sekinoto, wife of Fuwa Benzaemon is known only through a black-and-white reproduction in  Sharaku (1932).  It is not known where the copy reproduced is.

Ichikawa Danjūrō VI as Fuwa no Bansaku

Four copies are known of the hosoban print of Ichikawa Danjūrō VI as Fuwa no Bansaku, one each in the collections of the Achenbach Foundation for Graphic Arts at the Fine Arts Museums of San Francisco, the Art Institute of Chicago, the Honolulu Museum of Art, and the Metropolitan Museum of Art.

Arashi Ryūzō II as the servant Ukiyo Matabei

Three copies are known of the hosoban print of Arashi Ryūzō II as the servant (yakko) Ukiyo Matabei, one each in the collections of the Tokyo National Museum, Jōsai University, and the Art Institute of Chicago.

Arashi Ryūzō II as the manservant Ukiyo Matabei, and Ōtani Hiroji III as the manservant Tosa no Matabei

Four copies are known of the ōban print of Arashi Ryūzō II as the manservant Ukiyo Matabei, and Ōtani Hiroji III as the manservant Tosa no Matabei, one each in the collections of Tokyo National Museum, the Japan Ukiyo-e Museum, and the Hiraki Ukiyo-e Foundation, and another in a private collection.

Ōtani Hiroji III as the servant Tosa no Matabei

Two copies are known of the hosoban print of Ōtani Hiroji III as the servant (yakko) Tosa no Matabei; one each are in the collections of the Tokyo National Museum and the Museum of Fine Arts, Boston.

Bandō Mitsugorō II as the farmer Fukakusa no Jirōsaku

Four copies of the hosoban print of Bandō Mitsugorō II as the farmer Fukakusa no Jirōsaku, one each in the collections of the Tokyo National Museum, the Museum of Fine Arts, Boston, and the Metropolitan Museum of Art, and another in a private collection.

Ichikawa Tomiemon I as Inokuma Monbei

Seven copies are known of the hosoban print of Ichikawa Tomiemon I as Inokuma Monbei, one each in the collections of the Tokyo National Museum, the Rijksmuseum, the M. Walter Amstutz Collection, the Museum of Fine Arts, Boston, the Art Institute of Chicago, the Guimet Museum, and the Honolulu Museum of Art.

Ōtani Tokuji I as Monokusa Tarō

Sakata Hangorō III as Kosodate Kannonbō

Two copies of the hosoban print of Sakata Hangorō III as Kosodate Kannonbō; one each are in the collections of the Museum of Fine Arts, Boston, and the Art Institute of Chicago.

Segawa Tomisaburō II as the Courtesan Tōyama, and Ichikawa Kurizō as Higashiyama Yoshiwakamaru

Two copies are known of the hosoban print of Segawa Tomisaburō II as the Courtesan Tōyama, and Ichikawa Kurizō as Higashiyama Yoshiwakamaru (one each are in the collections of the Museum of Fine Arts, Boston, and the Metropolitan Museum of Art.

Ichikawa Yaozō III as Fuwa Banzaemon Shigekatsuhosoban print of Ichikawa Yaozō III as Fuwa Banzaemon Shigekatsu

Segawa Kikunojō III as the courtesan Katsuragi

 (1751–1810) as the courtesan Katsuragi ( Sawamura Sōjūrō III as Nagoya Sanzahosoban print of Sawamura Sōjūrō III as Nagoya Sanza

Sawamura Sōjūrō III as Nagoya Sanza, and Segawa Kikunojō III as the courtesan Katsuragiōban print of Sawamura Sōjūrō III as Nagoya Sanza, and Segawa Kikunojō III as the courtesan Katsuragi

Ichikawa Yaozō III as Fuwa Banzaemon, and Sakata Hangorō III as Kosodate Kannonbōōban print of Ichikawa Yaozō III as Fuwa Banzaemon, and Sakata Hangorō III as Kosodate Kannonbō

Shinrei Yaguchi no Watashi

Nakayama Tomisaburō I as Tsukuba Gozen, wife of Yoshioki

Nakamura Kumetarō II as Minato, wife of Yura Hyōgonosuke

Three copies are known of the hosoban print of Nakamura Kumetarō II as Yura Hyōgonosuke's wife Minato; one is in the collection of the Museum of Fine Arts, Boston, and two in that of the Metropolitan Museum of Art.

Ichikawa Komazō III as Minase Rokurō Munezumi in a kamishimo

Ichikawa Komazō III as Minase Rokurō Munezumi as a pilgrim

Two copies are known of the hosoban print of Ichikawa Komazō III as Minase Rokurō Munezumi as a pilgrim; one each are in the collections of the Tokyo National Museum and the Museum of Fine Arts, Boston.

Nakajima Kanzō II as Negoto no Chōzō the packhorse driver

Three copies are known of the hosoban print of Nakajima Kanzō II as Negoto no Chōzō the packhorse driver; one is in the collections of the Tokyo National Museum and the others are in that of the Museum of Fine Arts, Boston.

Morita Kan'ya VIII as Yura Hyōgonosuke

Five copies are known of the hosoban print of Morita Kan'ya VIII as Yura Hyōgonosuke; one each are in the collections of Jōsai University and the Art Institute of Chicago, and the others are in private collections.

Yomo no Nishiki Kokyō no Tabi-jiYomo no Nishiki Kokyō no Tabi-ji débuted at the Kiri-za theatre in the 8th month of 6th year of Kansei.

Matsumoto Yonesaburō I as the maid Otsuyu

Nakajima Wadaemon I as Tanbaya Hachiemon

One copy is known of the hosoban print of Nakajima Wadaemon I as Tanbaya Hachiemon; it is in a private collection.

Matsumoto Kōshirō IV as the hick spendthrift from Yamato, actually Ninokuchimura Magoemon

One copy is known of the hosoban print of Matsumoto Kōshirō IV as the hick spendthrift from Yamato, actually Ninokuchimura Magoemon; it is in the collection of the Art Institute of Chicago.

Ichikawa Komazō III as Kameya Chūbei, and Nakayama Tomisaburō as Umegawa

Six copies are known of the ōban print of Ichikawa Komazō III as Kameya Chūbei, and Nakayama Tomisaburō as Umegawa, one each in the collections of the Tokyo National Museum, the Hiraki Ukiyo-e Foundation, the British Museum, and the Bibliothèque nationale de France, and two in that of the Museum of Fine Arts, Boston.

Matsumoto Kōshirō IV as Ninokuchimura Magoemon, and Nakayama Tomisaburō as Umegawa

Six copies are known of the ōban print of Matsumoto Kōshirō IV as Ninokuchimura Magoemon, and Nakayama Tomisaburō as Umegawa, one each in the collections of the Tokyo National Museum, the Baur Foundation, the Royal Museums of Art and History, and the Harvard Art Museums, and two in that of the Museum of Fine Arts, Boston.

Nihon-matsu Michinoku Sodachi

Ōtani Oniji II as Kawashima Jibugorō

Two copies are known of the hosoban print of Ōtani Oniji II as Kawashima Jibugorō, one in the collection of the Tokyo National Museum and the other in a private collection.

Ichikawa Omezō I as Tomita Hyōtarō

One copy is known of the hosoban print of  I as Tomita Hyōtarō; it is in the collection of the Art Institute of Chicago.

Ichikawa Omezō I as Tomita Hyōtarō and Ōtani Oniji III as Kawashima Jibugorō

Eight copies are known of the ōban print of Ichikawa Omezō I as Tomita Hyōtarō and Ōtani Oniji III as Kawashima Jibugorō, one each in the collections of the Tokyo National Museum, the British Museum, the Museum of Fine Arts, Boston, the Royal Museums of Art and History, the Art Institute of Chicago, the Guimet Museum, the Honolulu Museum of Art, and the Metropolitan Museum of Art.  The print was earlier thought to be of Ichikawa Omezō I as Sekitori Ikazuchi Tsurunosuke and Ōtani Oniji III as Ukiyo Tsuchihei.

Nihon-matsu Michinoku Sodachi Niban-meNihon-matsu Michinoku Sodachi Niban-me

Bandō Hikosaburō III as Obiya Chōemon

Two copies are known of the hosoban print of Bandō Hikosaburō III as Obiya Chōemon; one is in the collection of the Museum of Fine Arts, Boston, and the other in the Grabhorn Collection at the Asian Art Museum of San Francisco.

Iwai Hanshirō IV as O-Han of the Shinanoya

One copy is known of the hosoban print of Iwai Hanshirō IV as O-Han of the Shinanoya; it is in the collection of the Museum of Asian Art.

Iwai Kiyotarō II as O-Sode, daughter of Futamiya

One copy is known of the hosoban print of Iwai Kiyotarō II as O-Sode, daughter of Futamiya; it is in the collection of the Hiraki Ukiyo-e Foundation.

Tanimura Torazō I as Kataoka Kōemon

One copy is known of the hosoban print of Tanimura Torazō I as Kataoka Kōemon; it is in the collection of the Tokyo National Museum.

Ichikawa Ebizō I as Ranmyaku no Kichi

One copy is known of the hosoban print of Ichikawa Ebizō I as Ranmyaku no Kichi; it is in the collection of the Tokyo National Museum.

Osagawa Tsuneyo II as Okinu, wife of Chōemon

One copy is known of the hosoban print of Osagawa Tsuneyo II as Chōemon's wife Okinu; it is in the collection of the Rijksmuseum.

Bandō Hikosaburō III as Obiya Chōemon, and Iwai Hanshirō IV as O-Han of the Shinanoya

Three copies are known of the ōban print of Bandō Hikosaburō III as Obiya Chōemon and Iwai Hanshirō IV as O-Han of the Shinanoya, one each in the Art Institute of Chicago, the Grabhorn Collection at the Asian Art Museum of San Francisco, and the Metropolitan Museum of Art.

Third period

47 hosoban, 13 aiban, and 4 ōban prints make up the third period (1794–1795).  They appeared in the eleventh month of the 6th year of Kansei.

11 of the 13 aiban prints are ōkubi yakusha-e. Amongst the details that set these works apart from Sharaku's earlier and later ones are the inclusion of a crest in the corner of each, and five of these prints feature clearly visible ears drawn with six lines, whereas those of Sharaku's other works are drawn with five lines. Enkyō is the only other ukiyo-e artist known to have produced aiban-sized ōkubi-e yakusha-e during the Edo period.

Uruō Toshi Meika no HomareUruō Toshi Meika no Homare débuted at the Miyako-za in the 11th month of the 6th year of Gansei.

Arashi Ryūzō II as Ōtomo Yamanushi

Four copies are known of hosoban print of Arashi Ryūzō II as Ōtomo Yamanushi, one each in the collections of the Museum of Fine Arts, Boston, the Grabhorn Collection at the Asian Art Museum of San Francisco, the Guimet Museum, and the Minneapolis Institute of Art.

Sanokawa Ichimatsu III as Ihohata

Two copies of the hosoban print of Sanokawa Ichimatsu III as Ihohata are known, one in the collection of Tokyo National Museum and the other at the Museum of Fine Arts, Boston.

Bandō Mitsugorō III as Katsura Kokingo Haruhisa

One copy is known of the hosoban print of Bandō Mitsugorō III as Katsura Kokingo Haruhisa and is at the Museum of Fine Arts, Boston.

Segawa Kikunojō III as Yamato Manzai, actually the shirabyōshi Hisakata

Three copies are known of the hosoban print of Segawa Kikunojō III as the shirabyōshi Hisakata disguised as Yamato Manzai; one copy each in the collections of the Tokyo National Museum, the Museum of Asian Art, and the Metropolitan Museum of Art.

This print pairs with Nakamura Nakazō II as Saizō Saiwaka and comes from the fourth part of Uruō Toshi Meika no Homare, Ōshukubai Koi no Hatsune.  Saiwaka and Manzai emerge from the hanamichi and perform a seated dance with three other characters.  Manzai then acts as one of the go-betweens in a love affair between Princess Konohana and Munesada.

Nakamura Nakazō II as Saizō Saiwaka, actually Aramaki Mimishirō Taketora

One copy is known of the hosoban print of Nakamura Nakazō II as Aramaki Mimishirō Taketora disguised as Saizō Saiwaka; it is at the Art Institute of Chicago.

This print pairs with Segawa Kikunojō III as Yamato Manzai and comes from the fourth part of Uruō Toshi Meika no Homare, Ōshukubai Koi no Hatsune.  Saiwaka and Manzai emerge from the hanamichi and perform a seated dance with three other characters.  Saiwaka then acts as one of the go-betweens in a love affair between Princess Konohana and Munesada before finally revealing himself as Aramaki Mimishirō before Hatano Daizen Taketora.

Nakamura Nakazō II succeeded to this stage name in the eleventh month of Kansei 6; before this he was known as Ōtani Oniji III, who appears in several other Sharaku prints, including Ōtani Oniji III as the manservant Edobei.

Nakamura Nakazō II as Aramaki Mimishirō Kanetora

Two copies known of the hosoban print of Nakamura Nakazō II as Aramaki Mimishirō Kanetora, one each at the Art Institute of Chicago and the Museum of Fine Arts, Boston.

Nakamura Noshio II as Ki no Tsurayuki's daughter Konohana

One copy is known of the hosoban print of Nakamura Noshio II as the poet Ki no Tsurayuki's daughter Konohana; it is at the Museum of Fine Arts, Boston.

Segawa Kikunojō III as the shirabyōshi Hisakata of Miyako Kujō

One copy is known of the hosoban print of Segawa Kikunojō III as the shirabyōshi Hisakata of Miyako Kujō and is at the Art Institute of Chicago.

Sawamura Sōjūrō III as Kujaku Saburō Narihira (hosoban)

Four copies are known of the hosoban print of Sawamura Sōjūrō III as Kujaku Saburō Narihira, one each in the collections of the Tokyo National Museum, the Ukiyo-e Ōta Memorial Museum of Art, the Royal Library of Belgium, and the Art Institute of Chicago.

Kataoka Nizaemon VII as Ki no Natora

Segawa Kikunojō III as Hanazono, wife of Ōtomo no Kuronushi

One copy of the hosoban print of Segawa Kikunojō III as Hanazono, wife of Ōtomo no Kuronushi; it is in a private collection.

Sawamura Sōjūrō III as Ōtomo no Kuronushi

Six copies are known of the hosoban print of Sawamura Sōjūrō III as the poet Ōtomo no Kuronushi, one each at the Tokyo National Museum, the Ukiyo-e Ōta Memorial Museum of Art, the Edoardo Chiossone Museum of Oriental Art, and the Nelson-Atkins Museum of Art, and two at the Museum of Fine Arts, Boston.

Nakamura Noshio II as Ono no Komachi

Three copies are known of the hosoban print of Nakamura Noshio II as the poet Ono no Komachi, one each at the Tokyo National Museum, the Ukiyo-e Ōta Memorial Museum of Art, and one in a private collection.

Bandō Hikosaburō III as Godai Saburō Chikatada

Two copies of the hosoban print of Bandō Hikosaburō III as Godai Saburō are known, one at the Art Institute of Chicago and the other in the Grabhorn Collection at the Asian Art Museum of San Francisco.

Segawa Tomisaburō II as the Ōtomos' maid Wakakusa, actually Prince Koretaka

Three copies of the hosoban print of Segawa Tomisaburō II as Prince Koretaka disguised as the Ōtomos' maid Wakakusa are known, one each in the collections of the Museum of Fine Arts, Boston, the Art Institute of Chicago, and the Metropolitan Museum of Art.

Ōtani Hiroji III as Hata no Daizen Taketora

One copy of the hosoban print of Ōtani Hiroji III as Hata no Daizen Taketora is known and is at the Tokyo National Museum.

Nakamura Nakazō II as the farmer Tsuchizō, actually Prince Koretaka

Three copies are known of the aiban print of Nakamura Nakazō II as Prince Koretaka disguised as the farmer Tsuchizō, one each in the collections of the Tokyo National Museum, the Museum of Fine Arts, Boston, and the Metropolitan Museum of Art.

Sawamura Sōjūrō III as Kujaku Saburō Narihira (Kinokuniya Tosshi)

Two copies are known of the aiban print of Sawamura Sōjūrō III as Kujaku Saburō Narihira, one each in the collections of the Tokyo National Museum and the Art Institute of Chicago.

Otokoyama Oedo no IshizueOtokoyama Oedo no Ishizue débuted at the Kiri-za in the 11th month of the 6th year of Gansei.

Ichikawa Ebizō I as Kamakura Gongorō Kagemasa

Two copies are known of the hosoban print of Ichikawa Ebizō I as Kamakura Gongorō Kagemasa, one each in the collections of the Kunsthalle Bremen and the Harvard Arthur M. Sackler Museum.

Sakakiyama Sangorō II as Princess Odae, daughter of Michinaga

Three copies are known of the hosoban print of Sakakiyama Sangorō II as Michinaga's daughter Princess Odae, one each in the collections of the Royal Museums of Art and History, the Art Institute of Chicago, and the Metropolitan Museum of Art.

Ichikawa Danjūrō VI as Mimana Yukinori

Three copies are known of the hosoban print of Ichikawa Danjūrō VI as Mimana Yukinori; it is in the collections of the Museum of Fine Arts, Boston, the Kunsthalle Bremen, and the Museum für Kunst und Gewerbe Hamburg.

Ichikawa Yaozō III as the sparrow-seller Bunji Yasukata, actually Chūzō Sanekata

One copy is known of the hosoban print of Ichikawa Yaozō III as Chūzō Sanekata disguised as the sparrow-seller Bunji Yasukata and is in the collection of the Art Institute of Chicago.

Sakata Hangorō III as Yahazu no Yahatei

One copy is known of the hosoban print of Sakata Hangorō III as Yahazu no Yahatei; it is in the collections of the Art Institute of Chicago.

Nakayama Tomisaburō I as the cowherd Ofude

Two copies are known of the hosoban print of Nakayama Tomisaburō I as the cowherd Ofude; one each are in the collections of the Museum of Fine Arts, Boston, and the Portland Art Museum.

Ichikawa Yaozō III as a kamuro performing a Lion Dance

Two copies of the hosoban print of Ichikawa Yaozō III as a kamuro performing a Lion Dance are known, one in the Museum of Fine Arts, Boston, and the other in the Metropolitan Museum of Art.  It forms the right half of a diptych with Nakayama Tomisaburō I as a kamuro performing a Lion Dance.

Nakayama Tomisaburō I as a kamuro performing a Lion Dance

Three copies of the hosoban print of Nakayama Tomisaburō I as a kamuro performing a Lion Dance are known, two in the Museum of Fine Arts, Boston, and the other in the Metropolitan Museum of Art.  It forms the left half of a diptych with Ichikawa Yaozō III as a kamuro performing a Lion Dance.

Ichikawa Ebizō I as the itinerant monk Ryōzan, actually Abe no Sadatō

Five copies of the hosoban print of Ichikawa Ebizō I as Abe no Sadatō disguised as the itinerant monk Ryōzan are known, one each in the collections of the Tokyo National Museum, the Rijksmuseum, the Museum of Fine Arts, Boston, the Art Institute of Chicago, and in a private collection.

Morita Kan'ya VIII as Genkaibō Ajari

One copy of the hosoban print of Morita Kan'ya VIII as Genkaibō Ajari is known and is in the collection of the Metropolitan Museum of Art.

Nakayama Tomisaburō I as Ohisa, wife of Sazanami Tatsugorō, actually Teriha, the younger sister of Abe Sadatō (hosoban)

One copy is known of the hosoban print of Nakayama Tomisaburō I as Teriha, the younger sister of Sadatō, disguised as Ohisa, the wife of Sazanami Tatsugorō; it is in the collection of the Tokyo National Museum.

Ichikawa Yaozō III as Hachiman Tarō Minamoto no Yoshiie

Two copies are known of the aiban print of Ichikawa Yaozō III as Hachiman Tarō Minamoto no Yoshiie, one each in the collections of the Tokyo National Museum and the Art Institute of Chicago.

Ichikawa Danjūrō VI as Arakawa Tarō Takesada

Three copies are known of the aiban print of Ichikawa Danjūrō VI as Arakawa Tarō Takesada; they are in the collections of the Tokyo National Museum, the Art Institute of Chicago, and the Museum für Kunst und Gewerbe Hamburg.

Nakayama Tomisaburō I as Ohisa, wife of Sazanami Tatsugorō, actually Teriha, the younger sister of Sadatō (aiban)

Three copies are known of the aiban print of Nakayama Tomisaburō I as Teriha, the younger sister of Sadatō, disguised as Ohisa, the wife of Sazanami Tatsugorō; one each are in the collections of the Tokyo National Museum, the Museum of Fine Arts, Boston, and the Art Institute of Chicago.

Ichikawa Ebizō I as Kamakura Gondayū, actually Abe no Sadatō

One copy is known of the hosoban print of Ichikawa Ebizō I as Abe no Sadatō disguised as Kamakura Gondayū; it is in the collection of the Harvard Arthur M. Sackler Museum.

Ichikawa Yaozō III as Hachiman Tarō Yoshiie

One copy is known of the hosoban print of Ichikawa Yaozō III as Hachiman Tarō Yoshiie; it is in the collection of the Metropolitan Museum of Art.

Otokoyama Oedo no Ishizue Niban-meOtokoyama Oedo no Ishizue Niban-me débuted at the Kiri-za in the 11th month of the 6th year of Gansei.

Yamashita Kinsaku II as the maid Ebizō Okane, actually Iwate Gozen, wife of Abe Sadatō (Tennōjiya Rikō)

Seven copies are known of the aiban print of Yamashita Kinsaku II as Abe Sadatō's wife Iwate Gozen disguised as the maid Ebizō Okane (Tennōjiya Rikō) known; one each are in the collections of the Tokyo National Museum, the Japan Ukiyo-e Museum, the British Museum, the Art Institute of Chicago, and the Philadelphia Museum of Art, and two in the Museum of Fine Arts, Boston.

Ichikawa Yaozō III as Saeki Kurando Tsunenori

One copy is known of the hosoban print of Ichikawa Yaozō III as Saeki Kurando Tsunenori and is in the collection of the Art Institute of Chicago.

Yamashita Kinsaku II as the maid Ebizō Okane, actually Iwate Gozen, wife of Abe Sadatō (plum-tree background)

Two copies are known of the hosoban print of Yamashita Kinsaku II as Abe Sadatō's wife Iwate Gozen disguised as the maid Ebizō Okane (plum-tree background); one each are in the collections of M. Walter Anstutz and the Metropolitan Museum of Art.

Yamashita Kinsaku II as Iwate Gozen, wife of Abe Sadatō (holding an umbrella)

Two copies are known of the hosoban print of Yamashita Kinsaku II as Iwate Gozen, wife of Abe Sadatō, holding an umbrella; one each are in the collections of the Hiraki Ukiyo-e Foundation and the Museum of Fine Arts, Boston.

Sakata Hangorō III as the groom Abumizuri no Iwazō in Koriyama, actually Kurisaka Tarō Tomonori

One copy is known of the hosoban print of Sakata Hangorō III as Kurisaka Tarō Tomonori disguised as the groom Abumizuri no Iwazō in Koriyama and is in the collection of the Art Institute of Chicago.

Matsu wa Misao Onna KusunokiMatsu wa Misao Onna Kusunoki ("Steadfast as the pine tree is the woman of the Kusanoki clan") débuted at the Kawarazaki-za in the 11th month of the 6th year of Gansei.

Onoe Matsusuke I as Ashikaga Takauji

One copy is known of the hosoban print of Onoe Matsusuke I as Ashikaga Takauji; it is in the Toledo Museum of Art.

Ichikawa Komazō III as Shinozuka Gorō (Sadatsuna)

Three copies are known of the hosoban print of Ichikawa Komazō III as Shinozuka Gorō (Sadatsuna); one each are in the collections of the Museum of Fine Arts, Boston, the Minneapolis Institute of Art, and another in a private collection.

Iwai Hanshirō IV as Kōtō no Naishi

The print was earlier believed to have been of Osagawa Tsuneyo II as Kojima, the wife of Bingo Saburō.

Ichikawa Komazō III as Nitta Yoshisada, actually Oyamada Tarō Takaie

Iwai Hanshirō IV as Chihaya, the younger sister of the Shintō priest Kenkō

Three copies are known of the hosoban print of Iwai Hanshirō IV as Chihaya, the younger sister of the Shintō priest Kenkō; one each are in the collections of the Museum of Fine Arts, Boston, and the New York Public Library, and another is in a private collection.

Iwai Hanshirō IV as the pilgrim O-Toma, daughter of O-Hina from Inamuragasaki in Kamakura

Three copies known of the hosoban print of Iwai Hanshirō IV as the pilgrim O-Toma, daughter of O-Hina from Inamuragasaki in Kamakura  ); one each is in the collections of the Tokyo National Museum, the Museum of Fine Arts, Boston, and the Art Institute of Chicago.

Onoe Matsusuke I as the lay priest Yuasa Magoroku

One copy is known of the hosoban print of Onoe Matsusuke I as the lay priest Yuasa Magoroku; it is in the collection of the Museum of Fine Arts, Boston.

Ichikawa Komazō III as the monk Saihō no Mida Jirō, actually Sagami Jirō Tokiyuki

One copy of the hosoban print of Ichikawa Komazō III as the monk Saihō no Mida Jirō, actually Sagami Jirō Tokiyuki; it is in the collection of the Royal Museums of Art and History.

Iwai Hanshirō IV as O-Toma, Daughter of O-Hina from Inamuragasaki in Kamakura, actually Kikusui, the wife of Kusunoki Masashige

One copy is known of the hosoban print of Iwai Hanshirō IV as Kusunoki Masashige's wife Kikusui disguised as O-Hina's daughter O-Toma from Inamuragasaki in Kamakura; it is in the collection of the Royal Library of Belgium.

Matsu ha Misao Onna Kusunoki Niban-meMatsu ha Misao Onna Kusunoki Niban-me débuted at the Kawarazaki-za in the 11th month of the 6th year of Gansei.

The five prints here form a pentaptych.

Osagawa Tsuneyo II as the hairdresser O-Roku

Three copies are known of the hosoban print of Osagawa Tsuneyo II as the hairdresser O-Roku; one each are in the collections of the Museum of Fine Arts, Boston, the Guimet Museum, and the Metropolitan Museum of Art.

Ichikawa Komazō III as Oyamada Tarō Takaie

Iwai Hanshirō IV as O-Toma, daughter of O-Hina from Inamuragasaki in Kamakura

One copy is known of the hosoban print of Iwai Hanshirō IV as Otoma, daughter of Ohina from Inamuragasaki in Kamakura; it is in the collection of the Art Institute of Chicago.

 Matsumoto Kōshirō IV as the boatman Minagawa Shin'emon of Reisengasaki in Kamakura, actually Hata Rokurōzaemon Tokiyoshi 

Six copies are known of the hosoban print of Matsumoto Kōshirō IV as  disguised as the boatman Minagawa Shin'emon of Reisengasaki in Kamakura, one each in the collections of the Waseda University Tsubouchi Memorial Theatre Museum, the Art Institute of Chicago, and the Portland Art Museum, and one each in three private collections.

Nakajima Wadaemon I as Migawari no Jizō, the master of the house

Three copies are known of the hosoban print of Nakajima Wadaemon I as Migawari no Jizō, the master of the house; one each are in the collections of the Museum of Fine Arts, Boston, the Brooklyn Museum, and the Art Institute of Chicago.

Matsu ha Misao Onna Kusunoki Shin KyōgenMatsu ha Misao Onna Kusunoki Shin Kyōgen débuted at the Kawarazaki-za in the 11th month of the 6th year of Gansei.

Ichikawa Komazō III as Ōdate Sabanosuke Terukado

Three copies are known of the aiban print of Ichikawa Komazō III as Ōdate Sabanosuke Terukado, one each in the collections of the Art Institute of Chicago, the National Museum, Kraków, and the Portland Art Museum.  The print was earlier thought to be of Ichikawa Komazō III as Oyamada Tarō.

Iwai Hanshirō IV as San, the maid servant of Ukiyonosuke, actually Saeda, the younger sister of Sabanosuke

One copy is known of the aiban print of Iwai Hanshirō IV as Sabanosuke's younger sister Saeda disguised as Ukiyonosuke's maid servant San; it is in the collection of the Art Institute of Chicago.

Hana no Miyako Kuruwa no NawabariHana no Miyako Kuruwa no Nawabari débuted at the Miyako-za in the 11th month of the 6th year of Gansei.

Bandō Mitsugorō II as the manservant Kugahei

Two copies are known of the aiban print of Bandō Mitsugorō II as the manservant Kugahei; one is at the Tokyo National Museum, the other in a private collection.

Segawa Kikunojō III as the maid O-Hama, actually the wife of Inanami Rukurōdayū (Hamamuraya Rokō)

Four copies are known of the aiban print of Segawa Kikunojō III as the maid O-Hama (one each are in the collections of the Tokyo National Museum, the Museum of Fine Arts, Boston, the Art Institute of Chicago, and the Guimet Museum.

Arashi Ryūzō II as the manservant Namihei (Toraya Toramaru)

One copy is known of the aiban print of Arashi Ryūzō II as the manservant Namihei (Toraya Toramaru); it is in the Royal Museums of Art and History.

Fourth period

10 hosoban and 5 aiban prints make up the fourth period from the first month of Kansei 7 (1795).  3 prints come from Nido no Kake Katsuiro Soga at the Kiri-za; 7 from Edo Sunago Kichirei Soga and Godairiki Koi no Fūjime at the Miyako-za; 1 is a sumo print; 2 are musha-e warrior prints; and 1 is of the god of luck Ebisu.

Edo Sunago Kichirei SogaEdo Sunago Kichirei Soga débuted at the Miyako-za in the 1st month of the 7th year of Gansei.

Bandō Hikosaburō III as Kudōzaemon Suketsune

Two copies are known of the hosoban print of Bandō Hikosaburō III as Kudōzaemon Suketsune; one each is in the collections of the Tokyo National Museum and the National Museum of Ethnology.

Sawamura Sōjūrō III as Soga Jūrō Sukenari

Three copies are known of the hosoban print of Sawamura Sōjūrō III as Soga Jūrō Sukenari; one each is in the collections of the Tokyo National Museum and the Metropolitan Museum of Art, and in the M. Walter Amstutz Collection.

Bandō Mitsugorō II as Soga Gorō Tokimune

One copy is known of the hosoban print of Bandō Mitsugorō II as Soga Gorō Tokimune; it is in the collection of the Tokyo National Museum.

Edo Sunago Kichirei Soga Niban-meEdo Sunago Kichirei Soga Niban-me (later titled Godairiki Koi no Fūjime ) débuted at the Miyako-za in the 1st month of the 7th year of Gansei.  It is based on an incident from 1742 in which the Satsuma samurai Hayata Hachiemon killed five people in Osaka.  This version is a revision of an adaptation under the title Godairiki Koi no Fūjime that débuted in Kyoto the previous year; the Edo version did not take the title Godairiki Koi no Fūjime until 1800.

Segawa Tomisaburō II as the maid Ochiyo

One copy of the hosoban print of Segawa Tomisaburō II as the maid Ochiyo is known and is in the collection of the Metropolitan Museum of Art.  The print was earlier believed to have been of the geisha Asaka.

Segawa Yūjirō II as the maid Otowa

One copy is known of the hosoban print of Segawa Yūjirō II as the maid Otowa; it is in a private collection.

Sawamura Sōjūrō III as Satsuma Gengobei

Two copies are known of the hosoban print of Sawamura Sōjūrō III as Satsuma Gengobei, one each in the collections of the Tokyo National Museum and the Museum of Fine Arts, Boston.

Iwao Kumesaburō I as the geisha Kumekichi

One copy is known of the hosoban print of Iwao Kumesaburō I as the geisha Kumekichi; it is in the collection of the Museum of Fine Arts, Boston.

Nido no Kake Katsuiro SogaNido no Kake Katsuiro Soga débuted at the Kiri-za in the 1st month of the 7th year of Gansei.

Ichikawa Ebizō I as Kudōzaemon Suketsune

Three copies are known of the hosoban print of Ichikawa Ebizō I as Kudōzaemon Suketsune; one each are in the collections of the Museum of Fine Arts, Boston, the Art Institute of Chicago, and the Guimet Museum.

Ichikawa Danjūrō VI as Soga Gōrō Tokimune

Two copies are known of the hosoban print of Ichikawa Danjūrō VI as Soga Gōrō Tokimune; one each are in the collections of the Museum of Fine Arts, Boston and the Art Institute of Chicago.

Ichikawa Yaozō III as Soga Jūrō Sukenari

Ichikawa Yaozō III as Soga Jūrō Sukenari

One copy is known of the hosoban print of Ichikawa Yaozō III as Soga Jūrō Sukenari; it is in the collection of the Art Institute of Chicago.

Other prints

Sumo prints

 was born in what is now Yamagata Prefecture in 1788. He attracted attention for his size, and drew crowds at sumo tournaments, where he dressed as a sumo wrestler and performed ring-entering ceremonies. Such was his popularity that he appeared in at least 25 prints between 1794 and 1798 by popular ukiyo-e artists such as Utamaro.

Daidōzan Bungorō enters the sumo ring (triptych)aiban triptych of Daidōzan Bungorō entering the sumo ring

Two sets of the triptych are known, one at the MOA Museum of Art and the other in a private collection.  The Sumo Museum in Tokyo has another copy of the central print.

Daidōzan Bungorō enters the sumo ring (single sheet)

One copy is known of the single sheet aiban print of Daidōzan Bungorō entering the sumo ring and is in the collection of the Hiraki Ukiyo-e Foundation.

The legend at the top of the print reads:

 
  Daidōzan Bungorō, age seven; weight: just over 19kanme; height: sevenshaku, sevensun, ninebu; entering the sumo ring this time in Edo

Daidōzan Bungorō lifting a go board

Daidōzan Bungorō quelling a demon

Daidōzan Bungorō quelling a demon

The print depicts Daidōzan standing on the back of a blue oni demon, poised to strike at it with a wooden mallet.  The legend at the top gives Daidōzan's weight as 21kan, 500monme (about 79kg), and his girth as 3shaku, 9sun (about 121cm)—measurements considerably larger than the year before.

Miscellaneous prints

Sharaku produced only two known musha-e warrior prints: one of Soga Gorō battling Gosho Gorōmaru and the other of
Taira no Koremichi battling an oni demon at a maple-leaf viewing party.  Such prints may have been an attempt by Sharaku to avoid being pigeon-holed as an actor-print designer.

Soga Gorō and Gosho Gorōmaru

One copy is known of the aiban print of Soga Gorō and Gosho Gorōmaru  ); it is in the collection of the Hiraki Ukiyo-e Foundation.

In 1193 the shōgun Minamoto no Yoritomo held the Fuji no Makigari, a grand hunting party in the area of Mount Fuji.  There, the  Jurō and Gorō killed Kudō Suketsune, a retainer of Yoritomo's and the murderer of the soga brothers' father.  In the ensuing fighting Jurō was killed and Gorō captured by the sumo wrestler Gosho Gorōmaru, who served at Yoritomo's palace.

Gorōmaru's hair is tied in a  topknot, a hairstyle worn by male youths during the Kamakura period.

Maple leaf-viewing

One copy is known of the aiban print of maple leaf-viewing; it is in the collection of the Art Institute of Chicago.

The story tells of the Heian-period warrior , who comes across a respectable woman and her handmaidens holding a maple leaf-viewing party. He joins the party and drinks himself unconscious. When he awakens, the women have revealed themselves as oni demons. The print illustrates a fierce battle between Koremichi and a demon who holds him by the topknot.

Ebisu

One copy is known of the aiban print of Ebisu, one of the Seven Lucky Gods in Japanese mythology; it is in the collection of the Japan Ukiyo-e Museum.

Since the beginning of the Edo period, merchants in particular worshipped Ebisu as the god of wealth, long life, and happiness.  He wears a pointed  hat, sits beneath a Shintō shimenawa rope, and fishes from a waterside boulder.  He has abnormally large ears and grins widely, despite his entangled fishing line.

Hand fans

Otafuku

The printed fan measures 21.2 × 40.8 cm and depicts Otafuku throwing roasted soybeans to ward away oni demons during Setsubun, at the traditional Japanese Lunar New Year.

Old man

The sensu folding hand fan of an old man is a nikuhitsu-ga painting on  bamboo paper. To the left is a portrait of an old man, and to the right is a young boy standing on an actor portrait by Utagawa Toyokuni.

Matsumoto Kōshiro IV as Kakogawa Honzō and Matsumoto Yonesaburō as Konami

The sensu folding hand fan of Matsumoto Kōshiro IV as Kakogawa Honzō and Matsumoto Yonesaburō as Konami is in the collection of the Museum of Asian Art of Corfu.

The fan measures about 50cm.  It was identified and confirmed as a Sharaku work in 2008 and is believed to depict a scene from a May 1795 performance of Kanadehon Chūshingura.  Rather than a print, the fan is a nikuhitsu-ga painting on  bamboo paper.  It is signed (not stamped) Tōshūsai Sharaku ga.

Hanshita-e

Preparing a print involved having the print designer produce an ink drawing, which was then transferred to thin Mino paper.  The woodblock carver pasted this tracing, called a hanshita-e, face-down onto the woodblock.  The carver cut around the lines visible through the paper to make the key printing block.

Sumo hanshita-e

Tanikaze and Daidōzan

A hanshita-e in a private collection, depicting the sumo wrestlers Tanikaze and Daidōzan Bungorō.

At the turn of the 19th to 20th centuries,  travelled abroad and amassed a collection of ukiyo-e.  Amongst the items in his collection were seven hanshita-e sumo drawing signed Sharaku Ga.  These were lost with the rest of Kobayashi's collection in a fire during the 1923 Great Kantō earthquake.  This portrait of Tanikaze and Daidōzan is thought to be from the same series.

Actor hanshita-e

Onoe Matsusuke I and Ichikawa Ebizō I

The whereabouts are unknown of the hanshita-e of Onoe Matsusuke I and Ichikawa Ebizō I.

Sanokawa Ichimatsu III, Sakata Hangorō III, and Ichikawa Tomizaemon I

The whereabouts are unknown of the hanshita-e of Sansei Sanokawa Ichimatsu III, Sakata Hangorō III, and Ichikawa Tomizaemon I.

Nakagawa Tomisaburō II, Ichikawa Omezō I, Ichikawa Komazō III

The hanshita-e of Segawa Tomisaburō II, Ichikawa Omezō I, Ichikawa Komazō III is in a private collection.

Bandō Mitsugorō II, Ōtani Oniji III, and Segawa Kikunojō III

A hanshita-e in the collection of the Museum of Fine Arts, Boston, depicts the actors Bandō Mitsugorō II, Ōtani Oniji III, and Segawa Kikunojō III.

Ichikawa Yaozō III, Sawamura Sōjūrō III, and Osagawa Tsuneyo II

A hanshita-e in the collection of the Museum of Fine Arts, Boston, depicting the actors Ichikawa Yaozō III, Sawamura Sōjūrō III, and Osagawa Tsuneyo II.

Arashi Ryūzō II and Morita Kan'ya VIII

A hanshita-e in the collection of the Art Institute of Chicago, depicting the actors Arashi Ryūzō II and Morita Kan'ya VIII.

Iwai Kiyotarō I, Nakamura Sukegorō II, and Bandō Hikosaburō III

A hanshita-e in a private collection depicts Iwai Kiyotarō I, and Bandō Hikosaburō III.

Ichikawa Monnosuke II, Matsumoto Kōshirō IV, and Iwai Hanshirō IV

The Guimet Museum has a hanshita-e depicting Ichikawa Monnosuke II, Matsumoto Kōshirō IV, and Iwai Hanshirō IV.

Segawa Yūjirō II and Matsumoto Yonesaburō I

The Guimet Museum has a hanshita-e depicting Segawa Yūjirō II and Matsumoto Yonesaburō I ( '').

Notes

References

Works cited

 
 
 
 
 
 
 
  (pages unnumbered)
 
 
 
 
 
 
 
 
 

Sharaku
Ukiyo-e